Taiwan maintains an active conscription system in accordance with the regulations set by the government of the Republic of China. All qualified male citizens of military age are obligated to perform 1 year on active duty military service or receive 4 months of military training.

In the early history of Taiwan, armed forces were composed of military volunteers. Conscription was first enforced in Taiwan in January 1945, the final year of Japanese colonial rule. The Government-General of Taiwan forcibly drafted Taiwanese people to join the Imperial Japanese Army (IJA) and Navy (IJN) to fight on in World War II. After the Surrender of Japan, the government of the Republic of China which occupied Taiwan as the representative of the Allied Forces in 1945, restarted conscription in Taiwan in December 1949 just after losing the Chinese Civil War on the mainland and retreating to the island. Duration of compulsory military service for all Taiwanese male citizens ranged between 2 and 3 years in the 2nd half of the 20th century.

In the 2000s, the government of the Republic of China were aiming for an all volunteer military. Duration of compulsory military service were reduced gradually from 2 years in 2000 to 1 year in 2008. In addition, an alternative civilian service system, called the substitute service, was also established in 2000. In the 2010s, the government made further progress for an all volunteer military goal to end the mandatory military service. A separate military training scheme was implemented in 2013, which has a duration of about 4 months. The transition from active duty military service to military training was done in late 2018. Starting 2019, most personnel of Republic of China Armed Forces were largely military volunteers.

However, since 2017, the rapid deterioration of People's Republic of China–United States relations has made a concern that the PRC may seek to finalize the current ambiguous status quo of Taiwan Strait dating back to the 1940s with its People's Liberation Army (PLA). In December 2022, the government of the Republic of China announced an reinstatement of the mandatory 1 year long active duty military service from January 2024.

History

Early years 

Early ruling regimes of Taiwan, such as Dutch East India Company, Spanish Empire, Kingdom of Tungning, Qing Empire, and Republic of Formosa, maintained their own armed forces in Taiwan from recruiting military volunteers from Taiwanese people (including Taiwanese indigenous peoples) or from outside of Taiwan.

Japanese rule 

Since the beginning of the Second Sino-Japanese War in 1937, the Government-General of Taiwan recruited Taiwanese military volunteers to serve in the Imperial Japanese Army and Navy. The 1941 Japanese attack on Pearl Harbor has made the war between Japan and China up to a full scale World War II. As the war beak, the Government-General of Taiwan set up several military recruiting programs for Taiwanese people to join the military, including 
  (since 1942, for Taiwanese indigenous peoples), 
  (since 1942, for joining the Imperial Japanese Army), and
  (since 1943, for joining the Imperial Japanese Navy).
Finally, conscription was performed in Taiwan from January 1945, until the surrender of Japan in August 1945.

From 1937 to 1945, over 207,183 Taiwanese people served in the Imperial Japanese military, including 80,433 on active duty and 126,750 civilian employees.

After World War II 

In August 1945, after the World War II, the Republic of China (ROC) occupied Taiwan as the representative of the Allied Forces. However, after losing the Chinese Civil War, the government retreated to Taiwan, the place it just occupied from Japan 4 years ago, in December 1949. Mandatory conscription was introduced in Taiwan in December 1949 to prevent possible invasion from the Chinese Communist Party-led People's Republic of China (PRC).

In the 1950s, the government enacted significant amendments to the Act of Military Service System to modernize the conscription system in Taiwan. The amended Act has clarified the male citizens shall be on 2 to 3 years of active duty in the Armed Forces depends on the branches (2 years for Army, 3 years for Navy, Air Force, Marine Corps). The amended Act also created a system for the Ministry of National Defense to select reserved officers and reserved non-commissioned officer from regular male citizens to extend the military mobilization ability. This situation was created due to geopolitics under the Cold War and remained unchanged until late 1980s.

Democratization 
Taiwan announced to lift the martial law in 1987 and implemented a full scale democratization in the 1990s. The conscription policy has also been reviewed at his period. At his time, the majority of all enlisted positions in the Republic of China Armed Forces (ROCAF) were filled by draftees which served 2 years on active duty. As the national defense policy has changed, the duration of mandatory service has also been reduced. From 2 years in 1990 down to 1 year 10 months in 2000. Then a 2 months term cut on mandatory military service each year between 2004 and 2008 until a total of 1 year remained in 2008.

In the 2000s, there has also been an increase in the service options open to draftees, including alternative civilian service system, called Substitute service, with the Ministry of the Interior (MOI), as well as specialized service options for draftees in specific professions. The National Conscription Agency has also been established under MOI to administrates the raft process is set forth by the Act of Military Service System.

Transition to all-volunteer military forces 
In 2007, the Ministry of National Defense had announced that should voluntary enlistment reach sufficient numbers, the compulsory service period for draftees will be shortened to 14 months. It will be further shortened to 12 months in 2009.

On March 10, 2009, Minister of Defense Chen Chao-min said by the end of 2014, the country will have an all-volunteer military force. The process of removing conscription will begin in 2010 and by the end of 2014 an all volunteer force will replace the conscripts. Individuals who wish to join must have a minimum of high school education and those who do not volunteer for the military will be required to complete four months of military boot camp.

In 2012, it was reported that from 2013 on, military draftees born after January 1, 1994, will only need to receive four months of military training and will no longer be required to serve one year of military service, and that the government was on track to replace all serving conscripts with volunteers by the end of 2014. However, this timetable was pushed back in 2013 to the end of 2016. Ultimately, this plan was scrapped and plans for abolishing conscription were never brought up thereafter.

Service time for men born on or after January 1, 1994, was cut to four months in 2013. The last group of mandatory conscripts were discharged in December 2018.  However, other sources says that conscription unofficially if not technically still exists as the transition to an all-volunteer force has been unsuccessful in recruiting enough volunteer soldiers to fulfill the defensive needs.

In January 2023, the Taiwanese Defense Ministry announced that it would allow women to volunteer for reserve force training, amid an increase of military pressure from China. The Defense Ministry stated that it only trained male reservists because it only had sufficient capacity to accommodate men. Taiwanese lawmakers claimed excluding women from reserve training amounted to gender discrimination.

Resumption of active duty conscription 

Since 2017, the rapid deterioration of People's Republic of China–United States relations has made a concern that China may seek to change the status quo of Taiwan Strait with its People's Liberation Army (PLA).

In December 2022, President Tsai Ing-wen announced the extension of compulsory military service to one year from four months from 2024, returning to the duration of conscription from 2008 to 2013, citing the rising military threat from the People's Liberation Army (PLA) of the People's Republic of China (PRC).

Statutory framework 
Military service is defined as a duty of citizens in the Article 20 of the Constitution of the Republic of China: "The people shall have the duty of performing military service in accordance with law." The Act of Military Service System (兵役法) and the Enforcement Act of Act of Military Service System (兵役法施行法) provide details of the country's military service system and procedures to conduct conscription in Taiwan.

In the regulations, the conscription is handled jointly by the Ministry of the Interior and the Ministry of National Defense. The National Conscription Agency was created under the Ministry of the Interior in 2002 to administrate the conscription in Taiwan.

Types of military service 
In accordance with the Law, male citizens achieved conscription age on the next January 1 after his 18th birthday. Conscription age male citizens are required to report its basic profiles the and attend conscription physical examination. Qualified conscription age male citizens may serve in the following types of military service to fulfill the statutory obligation.

After completing the service period required by law, the conscription age male citizens are transformed into military reserve force. Male citizens performed Standing Soldier Service has their conscription age end and discharged in the next January 1 after their 36th birthday. However, male citizens performed in Reserved Officer and Non-Commissioned Officer Service has their conscription age end and discharged until they turned 50 in age.

Draft process 
The military draft process occurs in four steps:
 Military Registration Investigation: Interview conducted by the conscription sections of local government offices to determine the educational background of the draftee as well as any special skills (e.g. proficiency in a foreign language). Generally occurs upon a male ROC national's 19th birthday or periodically upon his establishment (or change) of residence in ROC administered territories while of draft age but not yet drafted. Education and other deferments may be granted at this point if the draftee is eligible. If the draftee is not eligible for a deferment, a physical examination is scheduled. The draftee may also apply for alternative or national defense service at this point. In the case of the latter, the draftee will be required to compete successfully at an officer selection board for the desired billet, after which he will continue directly on to officer training school following completion of the physical exam.
 Physical Examination: Draftee undergoes a full physical examination at a hospital approved by the Department of Health. Physical fitness is classified on three levels, A, B, and C, with level A and B draftees considered physically fit for military service.
 Drawing Lots: Draftees fit for military service then draw lots to determine if they will serve in the Army, Navy, Air Force, or Marine Corps (Military police officers are selected from Army draftees). The chances of drawing for each service are not equal with the Army generally being the most probable, the Navy intermediate, and the Air Force and Marines being the least probable.
 Basic Training: After being assigned a service branch, the draftee is then assigned a date to begin basic training, after which the draftee will enter active duty.

See also
 Military service
 National Conscription Agency

References

Further reading

External links
 National Conscription Agency, Ministry of the Interior
 Military draft information, Dept. of Compulsory Military Service, Taipei City Government
  (archived from the original on 2006-11-27)

Taiwan
Law of Taiwan
Military of the Republic of China